Esther Hicks (née Weaver, born March 5, 1948) is an American inspirational speaker, channeler, and author. She has co-written nine books with her late husband Jerry Hicks, presented numerous workshops on the law of attraction with Abraham-Hicks Publications and appeared in the original version of the 2006 film The Secret. The Hicks' books, including the series The Law of Attraction, are – according to Esther Hicks – "translated from a group of non-physical entities called Abraham". Hicks describes what she is doing as tapping into "infinite intelligence".

Biography
Esther Weaver was born in Coalville, Utah on March 5, 1948. At age 20 she met her first husband, and from that marriage were born two daughters, one of whom (Tracy) works with her.  In 1976 she met Jerry Hicks, then a successful Amway distributor, and they married four years later. In his early life Jerry Hicks had been a circus acrobat for two years in Cuba, and then, beginning in 1948, had toured for 20 years as a musician, master of ceremonies, and comedian. Jerry Hicks died November 18, 2011, from cancer. He was 85 years old.

Outline of Abraham–Hicks' teachings
According to Esther and Jerry Hicks, "Abraham" consists of a group of entities that are "interpreted" by Esther Hicks. Abraham has described themselves as "a group consciousness from the non-physical dimension". They have also said, "We are that which you are. You are the leading edge of that which we are. We are that which is at the heart of all religions." Abraham has said through Esther that, whenever one feels moments of great love, exhilaration, or pure joy, that is the energy of source and that is who Abraham is.

Emotions are a person's guidance system that indicates how close or distant that person is to how their Source feels about a particular topic of focus.  Life is meant to be fun and easy. The essence of Abraham–Hicks' teachings since 1985 has been presented as follows:

 Individuals are physical extensions of the non-physical.
 People are in their bodies because they chose to be.
 The basis of life is freedom; the purpose of life is joy; the result of life is growth.
 People are creators; they create with their thoughts, attention and frequency.
 Whatever people can imagine clearly with emotion, by creating a perfect vibrational match, is theirs to be, or do, or have.
 Individuals choose their creations as they choose their focus.
 Emotions indicate what people are creating, either consciously or unconsciously.
 The universe adores people; it knows their broadest intentions.
 Individuals are invited to happily relax into their natural well-being and know that all is well.
 Life is not meant to be a struggle, but a process of allowing.
 People are creators of "throughways" on their unique "paths of joy".
 Desirable physical manifestations such as money, relationships, and lifestyle success are by-products of focusing on joy.
 Individuals may depart their body without illness or pain.
 People cannot die; their lives are everlasting.  Death of the physical body does not end the life of the individual. 
 The nature of the universe is life-affirming.  It is infinite, creative and expanding.
 All desire can be fulfilled, by bringing oneself into alignment with the desire.
 Individuals are not only a part of the universe, but are the very source of it.

A large part of Hicks' work centers around the law of attraction, a concept which William Walker Atkinson (1862–1932) wrote about in his book Thought Vibration or the Law of Attraction in the Thought World (1906).

Film
Esther Hicks narrated and appeared in the original version of the film The Secret, as well as being a central source of the film's inspiration. The footage featuring Hicks was removed from the later "Extended Edition" after the film's creator Rhonda Byrne, who has been involved in contractual disputes and litigation regarding the film, rescinded the original contract covering Hicks' participation, and asked that Hicks relinquish her "intellectual property rights in these areas forever". In an open letter posted on the internet, Hicks stated that she had been "uncomfortable with what felt to us like a rather aggressive marketing campaign," and that ultimately Abraham gave her the following advice: "Whenever you are given an ultimatum that says, 'if you don't do this, then we will have to do such and such,' it is best that you just let it go and move on. Otherwise there is always another, and this, and this, and this." The letter doesn't condemn Byrne, but clarifies why Hicks no longer appears in The Secret.

Hicks has since posted a video on YouTube further explaining her discomfort with The Secret and finally, her decision to discontinue her involvement with the film.

Books
Hay House, Inc. published the Hicks' book, Ask and it is Given, in September 2004. Since that book they have also published The Amazing Power of Deliberate Intent (January 2006), The Law of Attraction (October 2006), The Astonishing Power of Emotions (September 2008), Money and the Law of Attraction: Learning to Attract Health, Wealth & Happiness, and The Vortex: Where the Law of Attraction Assembles All Cooperative Relationships (2009). A series of fictional children's books, Sara I, II, and III, is also available. Several of their books have been translated into Spanish, French, Italian, German, Dutch, Swedish, Czech, Croatian, Slovenian, Slovak, Serbian, Romanian, Russian and Japanese.

 A New Beginning I: Handbook for Joyous Survival, by Jerry and Esther Hicks. Published by Abraham–Hicks Publications, 5th edition, 1988.
 A New Beginning II: A Personal Handbook to Enhance your Life, Liberty and Pursuit of Happiness, by Jerry and Esther Hicks. Published by Abraham–Hicks Publications, 1991.
 Sara and the Foreverness of Friends of a Feather, by Esther and Jerry Hicks. Published by Abraham–Hicks Publications, 1995.
 Ask and it is Given: Learning to Manifest Your Desires by Esther and Jerry Hicks. Published by Hay House, 2005.
 The Amazing Power of Deliberate Intent: Living the Art of Allowing, by Esther and Jerry Hicks. Contributor Louise L. Hay. Published by Hay House, 2005.
 The Law of Attraction: The Basics of the Teachings of Abraham Esther and Jerry Hicks. Published by Hay House, 2006.
 Sara, Book 1: Sara Learns the Secret about the Law of Attraction, by Esther and Jerry Hicks. Illustrated by Caroline S. Garrett. Published by Hay House, 2007.
 Sara, Book 2: Solomon's Fine Featherless Friends, by Esther and Jerry Hicks. Illustrated by Caroline S. Garrett. Published by Hay House Inc, 2007.
 Sara, Book 3: A Talking Owl is Worth a Thousand Words!, by Esther and Jerry Hicks. Illustrated by Caroline S. Garrett. Published by Hay House Inc, 2008.
 The Astonishing Power of Emotions, by Esther and Jerry Hicks. Published by Hay House Inc, 2008.
 Money and the Law of Attraction: Learning to Attract Health, Wealth & Happiness by Esther and Jerry Hicks. Published by Hay House, 2008.
 The Vortex: Where the Law of Attraction Assembles All Cooperative Relationships by Esther and Jerry Hicks. Published by Hay House, 2009.
 Getting into the Vortex: Guided Meditations CD and User Guide by Esther and Jerry Hicks. Release date November 15, 2010. Published by Hay House, 2009.

See also
 Jane Roberts
 Helen Schucman

References

External links

 Abraham–Hicks Official website

1948 births
Living people
American children's writers
American spiritual mediums
American spiritual teachers
American spiritual writers
Channellers
New Age writers
New Thought writers
Writers from San Antonio
People from Coalville, Utah